Sharad Kumar Chauhan, also known as Sharad Chauhan and Sharad Kumar, is an Indian politician, from the Aam Aadmi Party (AAP). He was a member of the Sixth Legislative Assembly of Delhi (MLA) from Nerela constituency also elected as Parliament Secretary of Revenue.

Personal life
Sharad Chauhan was born to Zile Singh (father) and Vidhya Devi on 29 June 1975 in Narela (Nerela) area of Delhi. He has two elder brothers. His eldest brother, Akhil Chauhan, is an engineer and a District Manager in Tata Power Delhi Distribution Limited (TPDDL) in Rohini. His second brother, Vikas Chauhan is a doctor and owns a hospital in Mumbai. He is married to Reeta Chauhan (Reeta) and has two sons Abhinav and Archit. Reeta is a councillor from Municipal Corporation of Delhi (MCD) and a housewife.

As per his affidavit for elections, his self-declared profession is farmer; the AAP party website describes him as a social worker. Chauhan is a matriculate (Xth standard) and passed from Government Boys Senior Secondary School, Bakhtawarpur in 1995. His wealth is ₹2.60 crore, as per his affidavit. He currently resides in Bakoli village in Delhi.

In 2016 he was arrested with six others in the suicide case of a girl named Soni from Narela for which he was granted Bail too.

Political career
Earlier, Chauhan was with Bahujan Samaj Party (BSP). He was elected as a councillor from MCD, Ward 4, Bakhtawarpur in 2007 by 6,593 votes; his wife is the councillor who currently represents the ward. She won the seat in 2012 by 15,975 votes after it was reserved for women. He lost the 2008 Delhi Legislative Assembly elections by a narrow margin of 800 votes on a BSP ticket against Jaswant Singh of the Indian National Congress (INC) party.

Chauhan switched to the Aam Aadmi Party (AAP) from the BSP, just before the 2015 elections. Chauhan fought the elections from the Nerela constituency. He got 96,143 votes and defeated his nearest rival and sitting MLA Neel Daman Khatri of the Bharatiya Janata Party (BJP) by a margin of 40,292 in the 2015 Delhi Legislative Assembly elections. The AAP won 67 out of the total 70 seats in the elections.

See also

Sixth Legislative Assembly of Delhi
Delhi Legislative Assembly
Aam Aadmi Party

Electoral performance

References 

10.AAP MLA Arrested for Suicide case of former party Volunteer

Delhi MLAs 2015–2020
Delhi MLAs 2020–2025
Living people
1975 births
Bahujan Samaj Party politicians
Aam Aadmi Party MLAs from Delhi